Yiech Pur Biel (born 1 January 1995) is a track and field athlete and UNHCR goodwill ambassador originally from Nasir, South Sudan, but now living and training in the United States. He was selected by the International Olympic Committee (IOC) to compete for the Refugee Olympic Team in the 800 m event at the 2016 Summer Olympics. He placed last in his heat.

In 2005 he fled from his home town of Nasir in Sudan to escape a civil war. After living in the Kakuma Refugee Camp for 10 years, he started running competitively in 2015. The Kakuma refugee camp is one of the largest refugee camps in the world with over 179,000 people. According to Biel there were no facilities, he even didn't have shoes and not a gym. Also the weather does not favour training because from morning until evening it is sunny and hot. In 2015 he was selected to join the Tegla Loroupe Foundation, that holds athletic trials in Kakuma. There he trained under Tegla Loroupe in Nairobi, along with four other middle-distance runners from South Sudan selected for the Olympic refugee team within a joint initiative by the International Olympic Committee (IOC) and the United Nations Refugee Agency (UNHCR).

Since competing at Rio, Pur has travelled to 26 countries as an athlete and advocate for refugees, speaking at events in New York and Paris and  returning to Kakuma to deliver a TEDx speech. He joined the Olympic Refugee Foundation as a board member upon its founding in 2017. On behalf of the 2016 Refugee Olympic Team, Pur and fellow Refugee Olympian Yusra Mardini received the International Crisis Group (ICG)’s Stephen J. Solarz Award. In August 2020, Pur was selected to be a Goodwill Ambassador for UNHCR. At the delayed 2020 Summer Olympics in Tokyo, Pur served as manager of the Refugee Olympic Team. In February 2022 he was elected to serve an eight year term as a member of the International Olympic Committee, becoming the first UNHCR-recognised refugee to be elected to the body.

Competitions

References

1995 births
Living people
South Sudanese male middle-distance runners
South Sudanese refugees
Athletes (track and field) at the 2016 Summer Olympics
Refugee Olympic Team at the 2016 Summer Olympics
South Sudanese expatriate sportspeople in Kenya
International Olympic Committee members
Refugees in Kenya
South Sudanese emigrants to the United States
Drake University alumni